The Russian Women's Handball Superleague is the premier women's handball competition in Russia. Currently eleven clubs take part in the competition, with the top eight playing the championship play-offs.

The Russian Championship's leading teams have been successful in EHF's competitions. Zvezda Zvenigorod won the Champions League and the EHF Cup, while Dynamo Volgograd, Istochnik Rostov and Lada Togliatti have won either the EHF Cup or the Cup Winners' Cup. Kuban Krasnodar, Luch Moscow (f. Trud) and Rostselmash also won international competitions back in the Soviet era.

In reaction to the 2022 Russian invasion of Ukraine, the International Handball Federation banned Russian and Belarus athletes and officials, and the European Handball Federation suspended the national teams of Russia and Belarus as well as Russian and Belarusian clubs competing in European handball competitions. Referees, officials, and commission members from Russia and Belarus will not be called upon for future activities. And new organisers will be sought for the YAC 16 EHF Beach Handball EURO and the Qualifier Tournaments for the Beach Handball EURO 2023, which were to be held in Moscow.

Teams 
Teams in the 2021-22 season.

List of champions

Statistics

EHF coefficients

The following data indicates Russian coefficient rankings between European handball leagues.

Country ranking
EHF League Ranking for 2022/23 season:

1.  (1)  Nemzeti Bajnokság I (157.67)
2.  (5)   Ligue Butagaz Énergie (118.50) 
3.  (2)  Russian Superleague (114.50)
4.  (3)  Bambusa Kvindeligaen (109.00)
5.  (6)  REMA 1000-ligaen (102.77) 
6.  (4)  Liga Națională (94.50)

References

Women's handball in Russia
Women's handball leagues
Women's sports leagues in Russia
Professional sports leagues in Russia